Ohio Township is one of twelve townships in Bartholomew County, Indiana, United States. As of the 2010 census, its population was 1,787 and it contained 782 housing units.

Geography

Unincorporated towns
 Grandview Lake
 North Ogilville
 Ogilville
(This list is based on USGS data and may include former settlements.)

Adjacent townships
 Harrison Township (north)
 Columbus Township (northeast)
 Wayne Township (east)
 Jackson Township (south)
 Van Buren Township, Brown County (west)

Cemeteries
The township contains these two cemeteries: Roth and Saint Paul.

Lakes
 Noblitt Lake

School districts
 Bartholomew County School Corporation

Political districts
 Indiana's 9th congressional district
 State House District 65
 State Senate District 41

References
 United States Census Bureau 2007 TIGER/Line Shapefiles
 United States Board on Geographic Names (GNIS)
 United States National Atlas

External links

 Indiana Township Association
 United Township Association of Indiana

Townships in Bartholomew County, Indiana
Townships in Indiana